The Heywood Baronetcy, of Claremont in the County Palatine of Lancaster, is a title in the Baronetage of the United Kingdom. It was created on 9 August 1838 for the banker, politician and philanthropist Benjamin Heywood. He had been instrumental in the passage of the 1832 Reform Act. The second Baronet was High Sheriff of Lancashire in 1851. The third Baronet was a railway entrepreneur and served as High Sheriff of Derbyshire
 in 1899. The fourth Baronet was High Sheriff of Staffordshire in 1922. The fifth Baronet was an artist.

Oliver Heywood, younger son of the first Baronet, was a banker and philanthropist. Cecil Percival Heywood, second son of the third Baronet and father of the fifth Baronet, was a Major-General in the Army. The Right Reverend Bernard Heywood, son of Reverend Henry Robinson, fifth son of the first Baronet, was Bishop of Ely.

Heywood baronets, of Claremont (1838)

 Sir Benjamin Heywood, 1st Baronet (1793–1865)
 Sir Thomas Percival Heywood, 2nd Baronet (15 March 1823 – 26 October 1897). Heywood was the son of Sir Benjamin Heywood, 1st Baronet. He retired from the banking business set up by his father and settled, with his wife Margaret, at the family's summer home at Dove Leys, near Denstone in North Staffordshire. He greatly enlarged Dove Leys, built the local Church of All Saints, together with a vicarage and a school, all designed by George Edmund Street. He played a major part in the founding of Denstone College, his surname 'Heywood' was used as one of the college's houses, and he was the school's first bursar. Heywood was also a Justice of the Peace for Staffordshire. He was an officer in the Staffordshire Yeomanry (Queen's Own Royal Regiment), in World War I attached to the Yeomanry Mounted Division in the Sinai and Palestine Campaign. His eldest son Arthur inherited his interest in metalwork, which led to his development of Minimum Gauge Railways.
 Sir Arthur Percival Heywood, 3rd Baronet (1849–1916)
 Sir (Graham) Percival Heywood, CB, DSO, 4th Baronet (1878–1946)
 Sir Oliver Kerr Heywood, 5th Baronet (1920–1992)
 Sir Peter Heywood, 6th Baronet (born 1947)

The heir presumptive to the baronetcy is Michael Heywood (born 1947), 2nd son of the 5th Baronet and younger twin brother of the 6th Baronet.

See also
Heywood's Bank

References

Kidd, Charles, Williamson, David (editors). Debrett's Peerage and Baronetage (1990 edition). New York: St Martin's Press, 1990.

Baronetcies in the Baronetage of the United Kingdom